Jepsen is a Danish–Norwegian patronymic surname meaning "son of Jep" (equivalent of Jacob). A homonymous form is Jebsen. The surname Jepsen has alternate spellings, including the English language Jepson. Jepsen may refer to:

Surname 
 Aage Jepsen Sparre (1462–1540), Danish priest, Archbishop of Lund 
 Allan K. Jepsen (born 1977), Danish football player
 Carly Rae Jepsen (born 1985), Canadian singer/songwriter
 George Jepsen (born 1954), Attorney General of Connecticut
 Glenn Lowell Jepsen (1903–1974), American paleontologist
 Les Jepsen (born 1967), American basketball player
 Kevin Jepsen (born 1984), American baseball player
 Maria Jepsen (born 1945), German, first woman to become a Lutheran bishop in the Evangelical Church in Germany and worldwide
 Marie Jepsen (1940–2018), Danish politician
 Mary Lou Jepsen (born 1965), American, founding chief technology officer of One Laptop Per Child   
 Roger Jepsen (1928–2020), U.S. Senator from Iowa

Jebsen 
 Jørg Tofte Jebsen (1888–1922), Norwegian physicist
 Peter Jebsen (1824–1892), Norwegian businessperson and politician

See also 
 Jepson
 Ibsen

Danish-language surnames
Norwegian-language surnames
Patronymic surnames